Dalkhaki is a village in Samangan Province, in northern Afghanistan. It lies 10 miles northwest of Aibak at an elevation of 3015 feet. The Tashkurgan River flows nearby, where it cuts an east–west ridge. It had a reported 120 families in the 1979 census.

See also
 Samangan Province

References

Populated places in Samangan Province